Leiocephalus macropus, commonly known as the Cuban side-blotched curlytail or Monte Verde curlytail lizard , is a species of lizard in the family Leiocephalidae (curly-tailed lizard). It is native to Cuba.

References

Leiocephalus
Reptiles described in 1863
Reptiles of Cuba
Taxa named by Edward Drinker Cope
Endemic fauna of Cuba